The 1994 Bulgarian Cup Final was the 54th final of the Bulgarian Cup, and was contested between Pirin Blagoevgrad and Levski Sofia on 4 May 1994 at Vasil Levski National Stadium in Sofia. Levski won the final 1–0.

Match

Details

See also
1993–94 A Group

References

External links
Full video of the final at YouTube.com

Bulgarian Cup finals
PFC Levski Sofia matches
OFC Pirin Blagoevgrad matches